The 15th Biathlon European Championships were held in Nové Město na Moravě, Czech Republic, from February 20 to February 24, 2008.

There were total of 16 competitions held: sprint, pursuit, individual and relay both for U26 and U21.

Schedule of events 
The schedule of the event stands below.

Results

U26

Men's

Women's

U21

Men's

Women's

Medal table

External links 
 Results

Biathlon European Championships
International sports competitions hosted by the Czech Republic
2008 in biathlon
2008 in Czech sport
Biathlon competitions in the Czech Republic